Onuxodon fowleri is a species of pearlfish first described by Smith, 1955. Onuxodon fowleri is part of the genus Onuxodon and the subfamily Carapinae. No subspecies are listed in the Catalog of Life.

References 

Carapidae
Fish described in 1955